Acts 2 is the second chapter of the Acts of the Apostles in the New Testament of the Christian Bible. The book containing this chapter is anonymous but early Christian tradition affirmed that Luke composed this book as well as the Gospel of Luke. This chapter records the events on the day of Pentecost, about 10 days after the ascension of Jesus Christ.

Text
The original text was written in Koine Greek. This chapter is divided into 47 verses.

Textual witnesses
Some early manuscripts containing the text of this chapter are:
 Papyrus 91 (3rd century; extant verses 30–37; 46–47)
 Codex Vaticanus (325–350)
 Codex Sinaiticus (330–360)
 Codex Bezae (~400)
 Codex Alexandrinus (400–440)
 Codex Ephraemi Rescriptus (~450)
 Codex Laudianus (~550)

Old Testament references
Acts 2:16–21: Joel 2:28–32
: Psalm 
: Psalm 
: Psalm

Coming of the Holy Spirit on the Day of Pentecost (2:1–43)

The biblical narrative of Pentecost is given in the second chapter of the Book of Acts. Present were about one hundred and twenty followers of Christ (Acts 1:15), including the Twelve Apostles (i.e. the eleven disciples and Matthias who had replaced Judas Iscariot), Jesus' mother Mary, various other women disciples and Jesus' brothers (Acts 1:14). Their reception of the Holy Spirit in the Upper Room and their empowerment to speak in tongues are recounted in Acts 2:1–6:

Verses 1–6

While those on whom the Spirit had descended were speaking in many languages, the Apostle Peter stood up with the eleven and proclaimed to the crowd that this event was the fulfillment of the prophecy of Joel (in Book of Joel 2:28–29): "…I will pour out my Spirit…". (Acts 2:17).

Verse 15 

"The third hour of the day" (about 9:00 AM): Peter explains that it is only breakfast time.

Verses 16–21 

The extended quotation from Joel 2:28–32 (LXX) is to support that this event is something predicted in Scripture, and it clarifies some points about the apostolic proclamation:
 The ecstatic speech is to be identified with the biblical gift of prophecy, as the work of the same Spirit of God.
 This is a phenomenon of 'the last days' (verse 17), but is a stage before the final 'day of the Lord' (verse 20).

Verses 22–24 

Peter then turns to the question, "Who was Jesus?", appealing to many people in the audience who had witnessed the miracles performed by Jesus, as a divine attestation of his ministry in the midst of his people (verse 22). Jesus' death is the responsibility of three groups: (1) 'the immediate agency' ('lawless hands' or 'lawless men'); (2) 'the proximate motive force' (the local audience which had witnessed Jesus' ministry, verses 22–23); and behind both of those, 'the divine plan' (verse 24).
"Loosening" (KJV/NKJV: "having loosed"): or having "destroyed or abolished"
"Pull of death" (KJV/NKJV: "pains of death"): also in the sense of "birth pangs"

Verses 25–28 
Verses 25 to 28 quote :

According to a Christian interpretation, verse 27 recalls the belief in the preservation of the mortal bodies of the saints, identified with the people whose souls weren't condemned to the Hell. The latter is referred with the Hebrew word Sheol.
It has also been seen as a prophecy of Jesus' Harrowing of Hell, while verse 26 would have predicted the final Resurrection of the flesh for which the "body also will rest in hope". 

Furthermore, the paths of life of  recall the more well known Jesus self-definition as being "the way, the truth, the life" (even using the same Greek words (respectively: hodous zōēs and hodos, alētheia, zōē)

Verses 32–36 
Verses 34 and 35 quotes  to conclude saying:

Verse 38 

"Remission": or "forgiveness" 

Acts 2:41 then reports that about 3000 people were baptized and added to the number of believers.

Verse 41 

It would take a long time to immerse all 3,000 people in a single public pool such as Pool of Siloam, so the apostles probably made use of many mikvehs around the Temple Mount. A "mikveh" is a stepped immersion pool used by Jews for purification, before prayer or worship, to become ritually clean. Archaeological excavations in Jerusalem (and other Jewish communities) have discovered hundreds of mikvehs from before, during, and after the time of Jesus.

The fact that many understood in their native language, what the Spirit was saying demonstrates that the first miracle the Holy Spirit carried out was the translation of the Gospel. This message is one that is communicating "God's deeds of power". Such miracle carries the undertone that the gospel, would be for a diverse group that for a long time had been divided. "Whereas in Babel humanity was divided by different tongues, in Pentecost that division was overcome."

Location of the First Pentecost

Traditional interpretation holds that the Descent of the Holy Spirit took place in the Upper Room, or Cenacle, on the day of Pentecost (Shavuot). The Upper Room was first mentioned in Luke 22:12–13. This Upper Room was to be the location of the Last Supper and the institution of Holy Communion. The other mention of an "upper room" is in Acts 1:13–14, the continuation of the Luke narrative, authored by the same biblical writer.

Here the disciples and women waited and they gave themselves up to constant prayer, until the arrival of the "wind" mentioned above.

A description of the first Church (2:44–47)
Acts 2:44–47 contains a description of the earliest church, giving a practical view of how the church members acted.  The verses cover several aspects of life:
 The believers held everything in common
 They sold property and possessions so as to give to anyone who was in need
 They met together in the temple courts each day
 They ate together in each other's homes.

See also
 2nd Chapter of Acts
 Christian socialism
 From each according to his ability, to each according to his needs
 Pentecost
 Simon Peter
 Zwijndrechtse nieuwlichters, a 19th-century Protestant sect which adopted an Acts 2-derived lifestyle
 Related Bible parts: Psalm 16, Psalm 110, Joel 2, Matthew 22, Mark 12, Luke 20, Acts 1, Acts 3, Acts 9, Acts 10, 1 Corinthians 15, Ephesians 2, Hebrews 1

References

Sources

External links
 King James Bible - Wikisource
English Translation with Parallel Latin Vulgate
Online Bible at GospelHall.org (ESV, KJV, Darby, American Standard Version, Bible in Basic English)
Multiple bible versions at Bible Gateway (NKJV, NIV, NRSV etc.)
 Acts 2 Parallel

02